EPCC may refer to:

 EPCC (Formerly Edinburgh Parallel Computing Centre), part of the University of Edinburgh
 Estonian Philharmonic Chamber Choir
 East Preston Cricket Club, a village cricket club in West Sussex
 Ever Present Compensation Coefficient
 El Paso Community College, Texas, USA
 East Peoria Chamber of Commerce, Illinois, USA
 Exton PC Council, a personal computer user group in Chester County, Pennsylvania, USA
 the four phases of Engineering, Procurement, Construction and Commissioning as in Engineering, procurement and construction, a form of contracting agreement in the construction industry (additional C at the end of EPCC stands for the Commissioning activities, but it is some times dropped).